The 1937 North Carolina Tar Heels football team represented the University of North Carolina at Chapel Hill during the 1937 college football season. The Tar Heels were led by second-year head coach Raymond Wolf and played their home games at Kenan Memorial Stadium. They competed as a member of the Southern Conference, finishing with an undefeated conference record of 4–0–1. North Carolina claims a conference championship for 1937, although Maryland is recognized as the official conference champion with a 2–0 conference record. On October 25, 1937, the Tar Heels made the school's first ever appearance in the AP Poll, which was in its second year of operation. The team finished ranked 19th in the final poll of the season.

Andy Bershak was a consensus All-American end for the Tar Heels.

Schedule

References

North Carolina
North Carolina Tar Heels football seasons
North Carolina Tar Heels football